Protadisura posttriphaena is a species of moth of the family Noctuidae. It is found in Madagascar.

Heliothinae